Ak Chyiyr  Children's Education Center is a boarding school for children from disadvantaged families located in Isfana, Kyrgyzstan. The construction of the boarding school was funded by a Kuwaiti organization. "Ak сhyiyr " means "white path" in Kyrgyz.

Construction of the school started in May 2017 and was completed in September of the same year. Ak Chyiyr  Children's Education Center can cater for approximately 315 students. The school is non-profit, co-educational, and non-denominational.

The medium of instruction at Ak Chyiyr  Children's Education Center is Kyrgyz. In addition to Kyrgyz, students also study three other languages, namely  Arabic, English, and Russian. Classes are offered for grades one through nine.

References

External links 

Secondary schools in Kyrgyzstan
Schools in Isfana
Educational institutions established in 2017
2017 establishments in Kyrgyzstan